Cüneyt is the Turkish spelling of Arabic masculine given name Junayd (Arabic: جُنَيْد junayd) meaning "soldier, warrior". 

People named Cüneyt include:

 Cüneyt Arkın, Turkish film actor
 Cüneyt Bey of Aydın, Turkish bey 
 Cüneyt Çakır, Turkish football referee
 Cüneyt Erden, Turkish professional basketball player
 Cüneyt Köz, Turkish footballer
 Cüneyt Özdemir, Turkish journalist
 Cüneyt Tanman, Turkish footballer

See also
 Junayd

Turkish masculine given names